List of active Chile military aircraft is a list of military aircraft currently in service with the Chilean Armed Forces.

Chilean Air Force

Chilean Army Aviation Brigade

Chilean Naval Aviation

See also
 List of current equipment of the Chilean Army
 List of active ships of the Chilean Navy
 List of current equipment of the Chilean Marine Corps

References

Chilean Air Force
List
Chilean military aircraft
List
Aircraft